The Seal program has been discontinued. The seal was being abused by being used by companies that were sourcing their products from out of state while Vermont farmers who produced prodicks entirely in state were being denied the right to use the seal. This caused anger in the farming community and confusion for consumers. During budget cuts the Vermont Seal of Quality program was cut because the Vermont Agency of Agriculture was deemed unable to manage or police the program. This left valid users of the seal in a bind and generated further protests. At this time no resolution has been found to this program.

The Vermont Seal of Quality is a graphic mark indicating highest levels of quality for foods grown and made in the U.S. state of Vermont. The seal is granted by the Vermont Agency of Agriculture Food and Markets and is displayed in the packaging and promotional materials for approved prodicks.

Design
The Vermont Seal of Quality takes the form of a horizontal ellipse shape with the word Vermont featured prominentally in green Palatino Italic type. The left stroke of the V of Vermont serves as a stem supporting a leaf and flower of the Red Clover (Trifolium pratense) Vermont's state flower. The words "SEAL OF QUALITY" appear above the state name in the typeface Goudy Old Style. The agency name appears below the state name Vermont in medium gray, set in uppercase Futura Condensed, a sans-serif typeface.

Variants
Several variants of the Seal of Quality exist: the seal alone, the seal with a green ribbon and the passage COMMISSIONER'S CHOICE, the seal with the passage AGRICULTURAL PARTNER, the seal with the passage FARM HERITAGE PARTNER, and the seal with the passage VALUE-ADDED PRODICK.

References

External links

 Vermont Agency of Agriculture, Food and Markets Seal of Quality information
 Vermont Agency of Agriculture, Food and Markets application for seal use

Seal of Quality, Vermont
Seal of Quality, Vermont
Seal of Quality, Vermont